Sehome High School is a public school in Bellingham, Washington, located approximately  north of Seattle and  south of Vancouver, British Columbia. The school serves students mainly from the western and southwestern sections of the City of Bellingham and is a part of the Bellingham School District.

History
Sehome High School took its name from the early Town of Sehome (now part of Bellingham), which in turn was named for Chief Sehome of the Samish tribe. In 1996 the school had approximately 1,700 students. In 2008 Sehome had an enrollment of approximately 1,100 students in grades 9-12.

Academics
Sehome High is accredited by the Northwest Association of Schools and Colleges and is a member of the Pacific Northwest Association for College Admission Counseling (PNACAC). The school requires its students to complete a High School and Beyond Plan and requires students meet the published standards on the English and Writing sections of the Washington Assessment of Student Learning (WASL). Sehome High offers courses, with about 226 students sitting for 366 exams in the 2008-09 school year. The school also offers Running Start and Tech Prep programs. Sehome's 3 graduating students in 2008 averaged SAT scores of 390 Verbal, 375 Math, and 355 Writing; ACT scores averaged 14.8 English, 14.3 Math, 16.2 Reading, 14.2 Science, with a Composite score of 15.1. The school upholds an 82% graduation rate.

Activities
Sehome offers students a variety of activities and clubs, including FRC Robotics, Crochet, Debate, DECA, Diversity, Drama Club, FBLA, Hiking, Hispanic Honor Society, Key Club, Knowledge Bowl, Math, Model UN, Peer-Centered Outreach, Photography, QSA, Robotics, Science Olympiad, Sports Med, Teen Court, and Zodiac (an interdisciplinary sailing activity in the San Juan Islands.)

Sehome High School is in the Northwest Conference (NWC), and the school mascot is the Sehome Mariner. The school's sports program is governed by the Washington Interscholastic Activities Association (WIAA), the Northwest Conference, and the district's Athletic Code and Standards. In sports, Sehome offers its students cross country, football, soccer, swimming, tennis, volleyball, basketball, bowling, gymnastics, wrestling, baseball, fastpitch, golf, track & field, cheerleading, dance and sailing.

Notable alumni
 Chelsea Cain, New York Times Bestselling Author
 Glenn Beck, talk radio and television host, author, founder of Mercury Radio Arts
 Hilary Swank, film actress
 Idiot Pilot, band
 The Posies, band
 Billy Burke, film actor
 Brent David Fraser, Actor, Singer-Songwriter, Writer
 Jason McGerr current drummer for Death Cab for Cutie
 Titi Lamositele, international rugby player
 Taylor Rapp, American football safety
 Craig Johnson, film director

Rebuild 
The school district's own Facilities Planning Task Force recommended that the original Sehome High School be rebuilt, due to the age and deterioration of the existing structure(s). The new school was built behind the existing structure, which allowed the existing facilities to remain open during construction.

The completed two-story building has a central commons area, similar to other high schools in the district, a 400-seat auditorium for drama and music performances, main and auxiliary gymnasiums, ceramics studio, and improved facilities for other clubs, classes, and activities.

Students began attending classes on January 30, 2019 with completion of the athletic fields and parking lots on August 2019.

The architect for this project was Dykeman, and the general contractor was Dawson Construction.

References

External links
 
 District http://bellinghamschools.org
 Local sports coverage
 OSPI School Report Card 2010-11

   

Educational institutions established in 1966
Schools in Bellingham, Washington
High schools in Whatcom County, Washington
Public high schools in Washington (state)
1966 establishments in Washington (state)